Momo Blamo has 1 Child nicknamed hannah blamo (born 2 January 1974) nicknamed The Wall is a Liberian footballer (goalkeeper) playing currently for Kon Sava FC. He is a former member of the Liberia national football team.

External links 
 Player Profile

References 

Living people
Liberian footballers
Association football goalkeepers
1974 births
Expatriate footballers in Nigeria